One Financial Center is a modern skyscraper adjacent to Dewey Square in the Financial District of Boston, Massachusetts. The remaining stories are offices, home to a number of law firms, Certified Public Accountants, and financial services companies.

The building is located on a historic  triangular piece of land next to South Station and the Federal Reserve Bank Building, joining the Fort Point Channel area with Boston's Financial District.

During the Big Dig (a project to create a new underground highway under the centre of Boston), extra care was needed to avoid subsidence of the soil under the building, as construction was underway just  from the building's foundation. The building was constructed on soil rather than bedrock due to the geography of the site.

The tower is topped off by two radio masts. Including its radio masts, One Financial Center is the 4th-tallest building in Boston (when measuring by pinnacle height), rising . Apart from the masts and their supporting cables, the roof of the building is flat with no crown.

Tenants
Citizens Bank
HarbourVest Partners
Loomis, Sayles & Company
Mintz, Levin, Cohn, Ferris, Glovsky, and Popeo
Technip
Pandora Radio

See also

List of tallest buildings in Boston

References

External links
One Financial Center 

Skyscraper office buildings in Boston
Office buildings completed in 1983
Jung Brannen buildings
Pietro Belluschi buildings
EverBank
Financial District, Boston